The 2020 IIHF Women's World Championship was scheduled to be an international ice hockey tournament run by the International Ice Hockey Federation. It was scheduled to be contested in Halifax and Truro, Canada, from 31 March to 10 April 2020.

On March 7, 2020, the tournament was cancelled by the IIHF due to the COVID-19 pandemic.

Planned participants

 – Promoted from Division I A

 – Promoted from Division I A

Match officials
Twelve referees and ten linesmen are selected for the tournament.

Rosters

Each team's roster consists of at least 15 skaters (forwards, and defencemen) and two goaltenders, and at most 20 skaters and three goaltenders. All ten participating nations, through the confirmation of their respective national associations, had to submit a "Long List" roster no later than two weeks before the tournament.

Preliminary round
The schedule was announced on 25 September 2019.

All times are local (UTC−3).

Group A

Group B

Knockout stage
There would have been a re-seeding after the quarterfinals.

Bracket

Quarterfinals

5–8th place semifinals

Semifinals

Fifth place game
The winner of this game earns a spot in Group A of the 2021 tournament.

Bronze medal game

Gold medal game

References

External links
Official website

IIHF Women's World Championship
2020 IIHF Women's World Championship
Ice hockey competitions in Halifax, Nova Scotia
IIHF Women's
IIHF Women's World Championship
IIHF Women's World Championship
IIHF Women's World Championship